The SD radar was an early form of radar developed by the United States Naval Research Laboratory between 1940 and 1941. It was installed on submarines to provide warning of enemy aircraft. Its omnidirectional antenna, however, prevented it from being able to provide bearing information, and it was used as a proximity radar. Its range was directly affected by the aircraft's size and altitude. Large aircraft with an altitude above 1000 feet AGL could be detected between twelve and twenty miles, and small aircraft at the same altitude between eight and fifteen miles, while aircraft flying lower could avoid detection altogether. Another disadvantage was the enemy's ability to use the SD radar signal to locate and target submarines, leading submarine commanders to only use the SD radar intermittently so as not to disclose their location.

See also
 SJ radar

References

Military radars of the United States
World War II American electronics
World War II radars
Naval radars
Equipment of the United States Navy
Military equipment introduced from 1940 to 1944